Kristina Andreyevna Astakhova (born 25 February 1997) is a Russian former pair skater. With partner Alexei Rogonov, she is the 2015 Winter Universiade silver medalist.

Career 
Early in her career, Astakhova competed with Nikita Bochkov. They won the bronze medal at the 2011 Russian Junior Championships and were sent to the 2011 World Junior Championships, where they finished 7th.

In 2012, Astakhova teamed up with Maxim Kurdyukov. They competed together for two seasons.

2014–15 season: Partnership with Rogonov 
By June 2014, she formed a partnership with Alexei Rogonov, coached by Artur Dmitriev. Astakhova/Rogonov won both of their 2014–15 ISU Challenger Series (CS) events, the 2014 CS Volvo Open Cup and the 2014 CS Golden Spin of Zagreb. In between their CS events they took bronze at the 2014 Rostelecom Cup, their Grand Prix debut. They came in fourth at the 2015 Russian Championships, won silver at the 2015 Winter Universiade, and placed 10th at the 2015 World Championships, competing in the place of Ksenia Stolbova / Fedor Klimov who had withdrawn.

2015–16 season 
Astakhova/Rogonov started the 2015–16 season on the Challenger Series, taking silver at the 2015 Ondrej Nepela Trophy behind Stolbova/Klimov. Competing on the Grand Prix series, they placed 7th at the 2015 Skate America and 5th at the 2015 Cup of China. After winning silver at the 2015 Golden Spin of Zagreb, Astakhova/Rogonov finished 4th at the 2016 Russian Championships, ahead of Natalja Zabijako / Alexander Enbert. They were selected to compete at the 2016 European Championships after Stolbova/Klimov withdrew due to injury. At the 2016 Europeans Astakhova/Rogonov placed 7th after placing 7th in both the short program and the free skate.

2016–17 season 
Astakhova/Rogonov won silver at both of their 2016–17 ISU Challenger Series (CS) events, the 2016 CS Finlandia Trophy and the 2016 CS Golden Spin of Zagreb. In between their CS events they skated two Grand Prix competitions. They placed 6th at the 2016 Skate America but took the bronze medal at the 2016 Rostelecom Cup. Later they came in fourth at the 2017 Russian Championships.

2017–18 season 
Astakhova/Rogonov started their season by taking silver medal at their first 2017–18 ISU Challenger Series event, the 2017 CS Ondrej Nepela Trophy They then finished 5th at the 2017 CS Finlandia Trophy. Competing on the Grand Prix series, they won two bronze medals, first at the 2017 Rostelecom Cup and then at the 2017 NHK Trophy where they scored their personal best score of 203.64 points. This was the first international event where they scored above 200 points. They then skated their 3rd CS event, the 2017 CS Golden Spin of Zagreb where they won their 2nd CS series silver of the season. In December 2017 they placed 4th at the 2018 Russian Championships. This was the 4th consecutive time that they had placed 4th at the Russian Championships.

it was announced by the Russian Figure Skating Federation on January 23, 2018, that Ksenia Stolbova wasn't invited to the 2018 Olympics. Because of this Astakhova/Rogonov were sent instead. Astakhova/Rogonov placed 12th at the 2018 Winter Olympics. Later they placed 8th at the 2018 World Championships.

Programs

With Rogonov

With Kurdyukov

With Bochkov

Competitive highlights 
GP: Grand Prix; CS: Challenger Series; JGP: Junior Grand Prix

With Rogonov

With Kurdyukov

With Bochkov

Detailed results 
Small medals for short and free programs awarded only at ISU Championships. At team events, medals awarded for team results only.

With Rogonov

References

External links 
 
 
 

Russian female pair skaters
1997 births
Living people
Figure skaters from Moscow
Universiade medalists in figure skating
Figure skaters at the 2018 Winter Olympics
Olympic figure skaters of Russia
Universiade silver medalists for Russia
Competitors at the 2015 Winter Universiade